Henry Whitestone (1819–1893) was an architect born in County Clare, Ireland who became one of the main architects of Louisville, Kentucky.

He is believed to have studied at University of Dublin.

He designed a number of works that are listed on the National Register of Historic Places.

Works include:
Ennis Courthouse, in Ennis, County Clare, Ireland, with architect John Keane
J.T.S. Brown and Son's Complex, 105, 107–109 W. Main St., Louisville, Kentucky (Whitestone, Henry), NRHP-listed
Fifth Ward School, 743 S. 5th St., Louisville, Kentucky (Rogers & Whitestone), NRHP-listed
Tompkins-Buchanan House, 851 S. 4th St., Louisville, Kentucky (Whitestone, Henry), NRHP-listed
Trade Mart Building, 131 W. Main St., Louisville, Kentucky (Whitestone, Henry), NRHP-listed
One or more works in Second and Market Streets Historic District, roughly, area around Second and Market Sts., Louisville, Kentucky (Whitestone, Henry), NRHP-listed
One or more works in Whiskey Row Historic District, 101-133 W. Main St., Louisville, Kentucky (Whitestone, Henry), NRHP-listed
Peterson-Dumesnil House, 310 South Peterson Avenue, Louisville, Kentucky, NRHP-listed

See also
Luckett and Farley#The Whitestone period

References

People from County Clare
Architects from Louisville, Kentucky
1819 births
1893 deaths
19th-century American architects
Irish emigrants to the United States (before 1923)